Following is a list of football clubs located in Mongolia, sorted alphabetically.

Anduud City FC (Ulaanbaatar)
Arvis FC (Ulaanbaatar)
Athletic 220 FC (Ulaanbaatar)
BCH Lions (Ulaanbaatar)
Deren FC (Deren, Dundgovi)
Erchim (UB Power Plant team) (Ulaanbaatar)
FC Ulaanbaatar (Ulaanbaatar)
FC Sumida-Gepro (Ulaanbaatar)
Khangarid (Erdenet)
Khaan Khuns-Erchim FC (Ulaanbaatar)
Khasiin Khulguud (Bank team) (Ulaanbaatar)
Khoromkhon (Ulaanbaatar)
Selenge Press (Ulaanbaatar)
New Mongol Bayangol FC (Ulaanbaatar)
Soyombiin Baarsuud FC (Ulaanbaatar)
SP Falcons (Ulaanbaatar)
Ulaanbaatar University (Ulaanbaatar)
Ulaanbaataryn Mazaalaynuud (Ulaanbaatar)
Ulaanbaataryn Unaganuud (Ulaanbaatar)

References

Mongolia
 
Football clubs
football clubs